Nelly Raquel Ramírez Alas (born 14 February 1995) is a Salvadoran footballer who plays as a midfielder for Alianza FC and the El Salvador women's national team.

Club career
Ramírez has played for Alianza FC in El Salvador.

International career
Ramírez capped for El Salvador at senior level during the 2018 CONCACAF Women's Championship qualification.

See also
List of El Salvador women's international footballers

References

1995 births
Living people
Salvadoran women's footballers
Women's association football midfielders
El Salvador women's international footballers